15th SDFCS Awards
December 14, 2010

Best Film: 
Winter's Bone

Best Director: 
Darren Aronofsky
Black Swan

The 15th San Diego Film Critics Society Awards were announced on December 14, 2010.

Winners and nominees

Best Actor
Colin Farrell – Ondine
Aaron Eckhart – Rabbit Hole
Jesse Eisenberg – The Social Network
Colin Firth – The King's Speech
James Franco – 127 Hours

Best Actress
Jennifer Lawrence – Winter's Bone
Carey Mulligan – Never Let Me Go
Natalie Portman – Black Swan
Tilda Swinton – I Am Love
Michelle Williams – Blue Valentine

Best Animated Film
Toy Story 3
Despicable Me
How to Train Your Dragon
The Illusionist
Tangled

Best Cinematography
Inception – Wally Pfister
127 Hours – Anthony Dod Mantle and Enrique Chediak
Black Swan – Matthew Libatique
Harry Potter and the Deathly Hallows –Part 1 – Eduardo Serra
Shutter Island – Robert Richardson

Best Director
Darren Aronofsky – Black Swan
Danny Boyle – 127 Hours
David Fincher – The Social Network
Debra Granik – Winter's Bone
Christopher Nolan – Inception

Best Documentary
Exit Through the Gift Shop
A Film Unfinished
Inside Job
The Tillman Story
Waiting for "Superman"

Best Editing
Scott Pilgrim vs. the World – Jonathan Amos and Paul Machliss
127 Hours – Jon Harris
Black Swan – Andrew Weisblum
Inception – Lee Smith
The Social Network – Angus Wall and Kirk Baxter

Best Ensemble Performance
44 Inch ChestAnother YearThe FighterThe Social NetworkWinter's BoneBest FilmWinter's Bone
Black Swan
The Fighter
Inception
The King's Speech
The Social Network

Best Foreign Language Film
I Am Love (Io sono l'amore) • Italy
Biutiful • Mexico
The Girl with the Dragon Tattoo (Män som hatar kvinnor) • Sweden
Mother (Madeo) • South Korea
No One Knows About Persian Cats (Kasi az gorbehaye irani khabar nadareh) • Iran

Best Production Design
Shutter Island – Dante Ferretti
Alice in Wonderland – Robert Stromberg
Black Swan – Therese De Prez
Harry Potter and the Deathly Hallows – Part 1 – Stuart Craig
Inception – Guy Hendrix Dyas

Best Score
Never Let Me Go – Rachel Portman
127 Hours – A. R. Rahman
Alice in Wonderland – Danny Elfman
Black Swan – Clint Mansell
The Social Network – Trent Reznor and Atticus Ross

Best Original Screenplay
Four Lions – Chris Morris, Jesse Armstrong and Sam Bain
Inception – Christopher Nolan
The King's Speech – David Seidler
Ondine – Neil Jordan
Toy Story 3 – Michael Arndt

Best Adapted Screenplay
The Social Network – Aaron Sorkin
Scott Pilgrim vs. the World – Edgar Wright and Michael Bacall
Shutter Island – Laeta Kalogridis
The Town – Ben Affleck, Peter Craig and Aaron Stockard
Winter's Bone – Debra Granik and Anne Rosellini

Best Supporting Actor
John Hawkes – Winter's Bone
Christian Bale – The Fighter
John Hurt – 44 Inch Chest
Jeremy Renner – The Town
Geoffrey Rush – The King's Speech

Best Supporting Actress
Lesley Manville – Another Year
Dale Dickey – Winter's Bone
Melissa Leo – The Fighter
Blake Lively – The Town
Jacki Weaver – Animal Kingdom

Body of Work
Rebecca Hall – Red Riding 1974, Please Give and The Town

References

2
2010 film awards
2010 in American cinema